Sweet Beliefs is the third full-length album by Cyann & Ben. It was released on 18 September 2006 on Ever Records.

Track listing
"Words"
"Sunny Morning"
"Sweet Beliefs"
"In Union with..."
"Guilty"
"Recurring"
"Let It Play"
"Somewhere in the Light of Time"
"Sparks of Love"

Reception
Allmusic  [ link]
Pitchfork Media (7.3/10) link

2006 albums